Primus Guma Guma Super Star (aka PGGSS) is an annual Rwandan reality singing competition show. PGGSS is sponsored by Bralirwa's Primus lager and was created by East African Promoters (EAP) to help grow music entertainment in Rwanda. Unlike East Africa's Tusker Project Fame and American Idol where the competitors are unknown talent, Primus Guma Guma Super Star takes known Rwandan artists (like Tom Close, King James, Riderman, and Dream Boys) and has them compete against each another in hopes of winning cash to promote their music career to new heights.

The 3rd season, which took place in 2013, was bigger than the previous 2 seasons and the journalists and show biz analysts billed Bralirwa's Primus Guma Guma Super Star the biggest and most-intense music contest in Rwanda.

Controversy 

In 2013, the media accused East African Promoters and Bralirwa, the two main organizers of Primus Guma Guma Super Star, for a massive rigging of the 2013 PGGSS season in favour of the current winner, Riderman.

Past winners

International Special Guests 
 In 2011, Primus Guma Guma Super Star hosted Sean Kingston.
 In 2012, Primus Guma Guma Super Star hosted Jason Derulo.

References 

Rwandan television shows
Singing talent shows
2011 television series debuts
Entertainment in Rwanda